Rodda is a British surname, possibly derived from the Old English word roda, meaning "forest clearing/open space", or from the town in Herefordshire named Rodd. An alternative derivation is found in Cornwall and amongst the Cornish diaspora.

People
 Adrian G. Rodda (1911-1997), New Zealand civil servant
 Albert S. Rodda (1912–2010), California State Senator
 Alby Rodda (1920–2002), Australian rules footballer
 Emily Rodda (born 1948), pen name of Australian author Jennifer Rowe
 Leonard Rodda (1892-1970), Australian politician
 Matt Rodda (born 1966), British politician

Other
 A. E. Rodda & Son, Cornish clotted cream makers
 Rodda Paint, a paint company in the USA